Trichodiadema setuliferum is a succulent plant of the genus Trichodiadema, native to the Karoo regions of the Cape Provinces, South Africa.

Description

It is a small, gracile, semi-erect plant, with long and minutely-papillate internodes. 

The leaves can reach a length of 24 mm, and are covered in bladder cells that have apically curving hair-like papillae. 

Apically the leaves are slightly recurved, and each has a diadem of up to 16 yellow-orange bristles.  

The flowers are pink to magenta.

Related species
This species is very similar to the partly syntopic Trichodiadema pomeridianum and Trichodiadema rogersiae. 

T. setuliferum can be distinguished from the other two by its papillate bladder cells; while those of the other two species are smooth and without papillae. 

In addition, Trichodiadema pomeridianum has much shorter leaves (only c.15 mm), while Trichodiadema rogersiae is a smaller plant with thicker, stronger branches. There are also fewer diadem bristles on both Trichodiadema pomeridianum (only 3-8) and Trichodiadema rogersiae (only 5-9).

References

setuliferum
Flora of the Cape Provinces
Taxa named by Martin Heinrich Gustav Schwantes
Taxa named by N. E. Brown